David Lerner Associates (DLA) is a privately held securities broker/dealer, with clients' assets totaling approximately $6 billion.  The headquarters is in Syosset, New York, and there are branch offices in Westport, CT; Boca Raton, Florida; Teaneck and Lawrenceville, NJ; and White Plains, NY. Their product offerings include municipal bonds, mutual funds, retirement planning, life insurance, and other services.[1]

History
David Lerner Associates was founded by David Lerner in 1976. The first office was established in Jericho, New York. David Lerner Associates employs approximately 400 people, with its headquarters in Syosset, New York and satellite offices in Lawrenceville and Teaneck, New Jersey; White Plains, New York; Westport, Connecticut; and Boca Raton, Florida.[2][3]

Community Involvement and Awards 
Lerner has been a notable donor to causes in the community, including the Trey Whitfield School in Brooklyn.[4] For 20 years, David Lerner Associates has been the prime sponsor of the Greater Long Island Running Club’s Annual Police Appreciation Run.[5]

In 2011,  a survey conducted by the Best Companies Group named David Lerner Associates 6th place in the "large employer category" of the Best Companies to Work for in New York State.[7]

Apple REIT 
Apple Hospitality REIT, Inc. (NYSE: APLE) is a publicly traded real estate investment trust (REIT) that owns one of the largest portfolios of upscale, select service hotels in the United States. The Company's portfolio consists of 236 hotels, with more than 30,000 guest rooms.

Apple REIT started out as a non-traded real estate investment trust, and David Lerner Associates was the exclusive broker for this product.

In May 2013, Apple REIT Six Inc. completed a merger with an affiliate of the Blackstone Group LP. Apple REIT Six was sold exclusively by the Lerner firm to investors from 2004 to 2006, with most shares at $11. Each holder of an Apple REIT Six unit received $11.10 in value, consisting of $9.20 in cash and $1.90 per share in preferred stock of the Blackstone affiliate, BRE Select Hotels Corp. Investors could redeem the new shares after seven and a half years; the shares have a dividend rate of 7%. The total transaction value of the deal was $1.2 billion.[8] The portfolio of Apple REIT Six consists of 66 hotels in 18 states and cashed out successfully for its investors.[9][10] [11]

Apple Hospitality was formed in March 2014 with the merger of Apple REIT Seven Inc., Apple REIT Eight Inc. and Apple REIT Nine Inc. and subsequently filed for IPO in April 2015. They started trading on the NYSE (APLE) in May 2015. [12] [13]

Apple Hospitality REIT announced in April 2016 that they were purchasing Apple Ten.  The merger was approved in September 2016.  This makes Apple Hospitality one of the largest select service lodging REITs in the industry, with an enterprise value of approximately $5.7 billion and a total equity market capitalization of approximately $4.4 billion.[14]

FINRA complaint and class action dismissal
In May 2011, the Financial Industry Regulatory Authority (FINRA) filed a class action lawsuit against David Lerner Associates, charging the firm with misleading investors by marketing unsuitable products to them and conducting insufficient due diligence on the company that managed its real estate funds.[3]

In October 2012, David Lerner Associates agreed to settle with FINRA for $14 million without admitting or denying the charges.[11] Lerner was fined $250,000 and suspended from the securities industry for one year, and head trader William Mason fined $200,000 and suspended for six months.[12]

In April 2013, U.S. District Judge Kiyo Matsumoto dismissed the class action lawsuit, ruling that investors had received sufficient disclosure to understand the risks of investing in its trusts.[13] In her opinion, Judge Matsumoto wrote, “Plaintiffs’ belabored Complaint appears only to confirm that the Apple REITs are currently functioning in exactly the manner that was anticipated and disclosed in the REITs’ prospectuses and other offering documents.”[14]

In December 2015, the FINRA Arbitration Panel dismissed with prejudice all claims in the FINRA customer arbitration against David Lerner Associates.

References

Financial services companies established in 1976
Investment companies of the United States